David Guggenheim is an American screenwriter, producer, and novelist, best known for writing the 2012 films Safe House and Stolen, as well as creating and writing for the 2016 television series Designated Survivor. In 2013, the film rights to a suspense novel published by Little, Brown and Company that Guggenheim co-wrote with Nicholas Mennuti entitled Weaponized, were purchased by Bluegrass Films and Guggenheim was attached as screenwriter. He also worked on an earlier draft of Bad Boys for Life, and the screenplays for Uncharted and the upcoming film Narco Sub.

His older brothers are screenwriters Marc Guggenheim and Eric Guggenheim.

In 2019, Guggenheim joined other WGA writers in firing their agents as part of the WGA's stand against the ATA and the practice of packaging.

References

External links

American male novelists
American male screenwriters
Jewish American novelists
Jewish American screenwriters
Living people
Place of birth missing (living people)
Year of birth missing (living people)
21st-century American Jews